Christuskirche (German for Christ Church) may refer to:

Germany
 Christuskirche (Königsberg) (now Kaliningrad, Russia), damaged in 1944/5 and demolished in 1960
 Ratshof Church or Christuskirche, in Königsberg
 Christuskirche, Mainz
 Christuskirche, Walsdorf, in Idstein, Hesse
 Christuskirche station, a Hamburg U-Bahn station in Eimsbüttel

Other countries
 Christuskirche, Paris, France
 Christuskirche, Rome, Italy
 German Speaking Evangelical Congregation in Iran or Christuskirche Teheran

See also
 Christ Church (disambiguation)